Renaissance High School is a public, magnet high school in the city of Detroit, Michigan. Founded in 1978 on the former site of Catholic Central High School, Renaissance graduated its first senior class in 1981. In 2005, a new building was dedicated at the site of the former Sinai Hospital.

Renaissance is one of four magnet high schools in the Detroit Public Schools district; (the others being Cass Technical High School, Detroit School of Arts, and Communication & Media Arts High School). Entrance is based on test scores and middle school grades.

Academics

Students at Renaissance must take seven courses a semester and complete 200 community service hours in order to graduate. Although students take only six courses a day, their schedules rotate to accomplish the seven course requirement. One way that the school provides for students to fulfill the 200-hour service requirement is through its JROTC (Junior Reserve Officers Training Corps) program.

Admissions
Admission to the school is selective. Originally, 8th and 9th grade students from public and private schools took a proficiency exam before admission. A combination of a student's grades in middle school or junior high and the exam score determined school admission. This policy was changed in 1994 to let transfer students attend the school, although they must fulfill the same graduation requirements as other students. In 2006, over 75% of the student body was African-American. Renaissance opened in 1978 with first-year ("freshman") and second-year ("sophomore") students. Its first four-year graduating class received their diplomas in June 1982.

Notable alumni
Janeé Ayers: Detroit City Council member at-large
Andrew Keenan-Bolger: Broadway actor
Ronald Bartell: NFL player for the Oakland Raiders
Joe Crawford: basketball player for Maccabi Rishon of Israel
Robin Givhan: Fashion editor [Washington Post] and Pulitzer Prize-winning writer 
Malik Hairston: NBA player
Alaric Jackson, NFL player for the Los Angeles Rams and Super Bowl LVI champion
Simone Missick, actor
Rickey Paulding: NBA player drafted by The Detroit Pistons
Tajuan Porter: Former Oregon Ducks basketball player
Diona Reasonover, actor
Ronald Talley: NFL player
Lawrence Thomas: NFL player for the New York Jets
Justin Turner: professional basketball player for the Motor City Cruise of the NBA G League.

References

External links

 Detroit Public Schools profile
 Renaissance High School (Archive, 2004–2007)
 Renaissance High School (Archive, 2001–2002)

Public high schools in Michigan
Educational institutions established in 1978
High schools in Detroit
Magnet schools in Michigan
1978 establishments in Michigan
 
Detroit Public Schools Community District